Pro and Con is a 1993 9 minute 16mm short animated film produced, directed and animated by Joanna Priestley and Joan Gratz using drawings on paper, pixillated hands and object animation. The "Pro" section of the film was written by Barbara Carnegie and Joanna Priestley and narrated by Lt. Janice Inman. The "Con" section was written by Jeff Green and narrated by Allen Nause. The sound was designed and produced by Lance Limbocker and Chel White with music by Chel White. Pro and Con was commissioned through the Metropolitan Arts Commission's Percent for Art Program in Multnomah County, Oregon.

Synopsis
Pro and Con investigates life in prison through two monologues: one by a corrections officer (Lt. Janice Inman), and the other by Oregon State Penitentiary inmate, written by Jeff Green.  The guard is concerned both with the inability of our current prison system to deal with the increasingly violent nature of crime and the cyclical nature of crime within families.  The inmate reflects on the isolation he feels- how much he misses not only his wife and family, but also such mundane activities as riding in a car.  Pro and Con features self-portraits that were drawn by inmates at the penitentiary and object animation of weapons and crafts that were confiscated from inmates.

Release
The film was re-released on DVD in 2005 by Microcinema International, and was screened in a retrospective of Priestley's work at the OpenLens Festival in 2009.

Reception
Stephen Holden of The New York Times called the film "another outstanding short by Joan Gratz and Joanna Priestley". Rebecca S. Albitz, of Pyramid Film and Video called the film "a brief but excellent exploration of the thoughts and emotions of those working and living in our prison system."

Awards and recognition
 Director's Choice Award, Black Maria Film Festival
 Gold Award, Cindy Competition
 Worldfest Gold Award, Worldfest Charleston
 Gold Eagle Award, CINE Competition
 First Prize, Birmingham Educational Film Festival
 Honorable Mention, Annecy International Animation Festival
 Honorable Mention, Northwest Film and Video Festival
 Honorable Mention, Bombay International Film Festival
 Honorable Mention, USA Film Festival
 Honorable Mention, Columbus Film Festival

Festivals
 Bombay International Film Festival (India)
 Annecy International Animation Festival (France)
 Holland Animation Festival
 Sinking Creek Film Festival (USA)
 Ottawa International Animation Festival (Canada)
 U.S.A. Film Festival 
 Womanimation! Film Festival (USA)

References

External links
 Pro and Con at the Internet Movie Database
 Joanna Priestley at the Internet Movie Database
 Joan Gratz at the Internet Movie Database

1993 films
1993 animated films
1993 short films
1990s American animated films
1990s animated short films
American animated short films
Films directed by Joanna Priestley
1990s English-language films